Amblychilepas is a genus of sea snails, marine gastropod mollusks in the family Fissurellidae, the keyhole limpets.

Distribution
The species from this genus can be found in temperate waters of Australia, except Amblychilepas platyactis that is found along the Atlantic coast of the Cape Peninsula, South Africa.

Description
Amblychilepas is closely associated with Dendrofissurella and Medusafissurella with which it shares radular and shell characters.

The body of species in this genus is larger than the shell. The anterior part of the oval shell is narrower than the rest. Both ends of the shell are somewhat raised. The sculpture of the shell shows fine radial ribs. The upper mantle fold only slightly envelops the edge of the shell. The apical opening (foramen) is elongate-oval and situated almost in the center. Long papillae extend from the mantle towards the foramen, as in A. nigrita.
The foot extends behind the shell with a length larger than the shell. Contrary to  Dendrofissurella and Medusafissurella, the foremost part of the foot (propodium) is unmodified.

The large outer lateral tooth of the radula is quadricuspid ( = with four cusps).

Species
Species within the genus Amblychilepas include:
 Amblychilepas javanicensis (Lamarck, 1822): type species.
 Amblychilepas nigrita (Sowerby, 1834)
 Amblychilepas platyactis McLean & Lilburn, 1986

The Indo-Pacific Molluscan Database also mentions the following species with names in current use 
 Amblychilepas compressa (Thiele, 1930)
 Amblychilepas crucis (Beddome, 1882)
 Amblychilepas oblonga (Menke, 1843)
 Amblychilepas omicron (Crosse & Fisher, 1864)
Species brought into synonymy
 Amblychilepas dubia (Reeve, 1849): synonym of Medusafissurella dubia (Reeve, 1849)
 Amblychilepas pritchardi Hedley, C., 1895: synonym of  Amblychilepas nigrita (Sowerby, 1834)
 Amblychilepas scutella (Gmelin, 1791): synonym of Dendrofissurella scutellum

References

 Vaught, K.C. (1989). A classification of the living Mollusca. American Malacologists: Melbourne, FL (USA). . XII, 195 pp.

External links
 

Fissurellidae